Nina Ann Nunes (born December 3, 1985) is an American former mixed martial artist who most competed in the women's flyweight division of the Ultimate Fighting Championship.

Background 
Nunes was born and raised in Weston, Florida. Her maternal grandparents descend from Macedonia. Nunes started practicing Taekwondo at the age of 6. She wrestled while at Lake Region High School. She began training in mixed martial arts in 2009 as a way to lose weight and to help keep in shape following a motorcycle accident.

Mixed martial arts career 
Nunes made her professional debut in 2010 competing in regional promotions, and amassed a record of 5–3 before joining Invicta FC.

Invicta FC 
Nunes made her promotional debut against Munah Holland on December 7, 2013 at Invicta FC 7. Nunes won the fight via TKO in the third round and earned the Knockout of the Night bonus award.

Ultimate Fighting Championship 
Nunes made her debut in the Ultimate Fighting Championship (UFC) against Juliana Lima on November 8, 2014 at UFC Fight Night 56. Nunes lost the fight via unanimous decision.

Nunes was expected to face Rose Namajunas on May 23, 2015 at UFC 187. Nunes missed weight on her first attempt at the weigh-ins, coming in 4 lbs overweight at 120 lbs. After having made no attempts to cut further, she was fined 20 percent of her fight purse, which went to Namajunas. However, on the day of the event, Nunes was pulled out of the bout by UFC doctors after contracting a case of the flu. As a result, Namajunas was pulled from the event entirely.

Nunes next faced Justine Kish at UFC 195 on January 2, 2016. She lost the fight by unanimous decision.

Nunes faced Jocelyn Jones-Lybarger at UFC Fight Night: Rodríguez vs. Penn on January 15, 2017. She won the fight via submission in the third round.

Nunes faced Angela Hill at UFC Fight Night: Poirier vs. Pettis on November 11, 2017. She won the fight via unanimous decision.

Nunes faced Randa Markos on July 28, 2018 at UFC on Fox: Alvarez vs. Poirier 2. She won the fight by unanimous decision.

Nunes faced Cláudia Gadelha on December 8, 2018 at UFC 231. She won the fight via unanimous decision.

Nunes faced Tatiana Suarez on June 8, 2019 at UFC 238. She lost the fight via unanimous decision.

On October 10, 2019, Nunes announced that she would put her mixed martial arts career on hold in order to attempt to have her first child. The attempts were successful as in March 2020, her wife Amanda Nunes announced that the couple is expecting their first child, to be born later that year. Nina Nunes gave birth to a daughter in September 2020.

Nunes faced Mackenzie Dern on April 10, 2021 at UFC on ABC 2. She lost the bout via first round armbar.

Nunes was scheduled to face Amanda Lemos on December 18, 2021 at UFC Fight Night 199. However, Nunes was removed from the bout for undisclosed reason and she was replaced by Angela Hill.

Move up to flyweight division
Nunes was scheduled to face Cynthia Calvillo in a flyweight bout on July 9, 2022 at UFC on ESPN 39. However, the day of the event, Nunes withdrew due to illness and the bout was initially cancelled, but eventually rescheduled for UFC on ESPN 41 on August 13, 2022. Nunes won the fight via split decision, and she announced her retirement after the fight.

Personal life 
Nunes is married to fellow UFC fighter Amanda Nunes, the reigning UFC Women's Bantamweight and Featherweight champion. The couple welcomed a daughter on September 24, 2020. In April 2021 she began using the last name Nunes within the UFC. Her April 10 fight against Mackenzie Dern was her first fight under her new last name.

Championships and accomplishments 
Invicta Fighting Championships
Knockout of the Night (One time) vs. Munah Holland

Mixed martial arts record 

|-
|Win
|align=center|11–7
|Cynthia Calvillo
|Decision (split)
|UFC on ESPN: Vera vs. Cruz
|
|align=center|3
|align=center|3:00
|San Diego, California, United States
|
|-
|Loss
|align=center|10–7
|Mackenzie Dern
|Submission (armbar)
|UFC on ABC: Vettori vs. Holland
|
|align=center|1
|align=center|4:48
|Las Vegas, Nevada, United States
|
|-
|Loss
|align=center|10–6
|Tatiana Suarez
|Decision (unanimous)
|UFC 238
|
|align=center|3
|align=center|5:00
|Chicago, Illinois, United States
|
|-
|Win
|align=center|10–5
|Cláudia Gadelha
|Decision (unanimous)
|UFC 231
|
|align=center|3
|align=center|5:00
|Toronto, Canada
|
|-
|Win
|align=center|9–5
|Randa Markos
|Decision (unanimous)
|UFC on Fox: Alvarez vs. Poirier 2
|
|align=center|3
|align=center|5:00
|Calgary, Alberta, Canada
|
|-
|Win
|align=center|8–5
|Angela Hill
|Decision (unanimous)
|UFC Fight Night: Poirier vs. Pettis
|
|align="center"|3
|align="center"|5:00
|Norfolk, Virginia, United States
|
|-
|Win
|style="text-align:center;"|7–5
|Jocelyn Jones-Lybarger
|Submission (rear-naked choke)
|UFC Fight Night: Rodríguez vs. Penn
|
|align="center"|3
|align="center"|3:39
|Phoenix, Arizona, United States
|
|-
|Loss
|style="text-align:center;"|6–5
|Justine Kish
|Decision (unanimous)
|UFC 195
|
|align="center"|3
|align="center"|5:00
|Las Vegas, Nevada, United States
|
|-
| Loss
| style="text-align:center;"| 6–4
| Juliana Lima
| Decision (unanimous)
| UFC Fight Night: Shogun vs. Saint Preux
| 
| style="text-align:center;"| 3
| style="text-align:center;"| 5:00
|Uberlândia, Brazil
|
|-
| Win
| style="text-align:center;"| 6–3
| Munah Holland
| TKO (punches)
| Invicta FC 7: Honchak vs. Smith
| 
| style="text-align:center;"| 3
| style="text-align:center;"| 3:54
| Kansas City, Missouri, United States
|
|-
| Win
| style="text-align:center;"| 5–3
| Aylla Caroline Lima
| TKO (body kick and punches)
| Premier Fight League 10
| 
| style="text-align:center;"| 1
| style="text-align:center;"| 1:25
|Serrinha, Brazil
|
|-
| Win
| style="text-align:center;"| 4–3
| Trisha Clark
| TKO (punches)
| Centurion Fights
| 
| style="text-align:center;"| 2
| style="text-align:center;"| 2:14
|St. Joseph, Missouri, United States
|
|-
| Win
| style="text-align:center;"| 3–3
| Tyra Parker
| Submission (armbar)
| Wild Bill's Fight Night 51
| 
| style="text-align:center;"| 2
| style="text-align:center;"| 2:00
|Duluth, Georgia, United States
|
|-
| Win
| style="text-align:center;"| 2–3
| Jessica Doerner
| TKO (punches)
| The Cage Inc.: Battle at the Border 11
| 
| style="text-align:center;"| 1
| style="text-align:center;"| 1:52
|Hankinson, North Dakota, United States
|
|-
| Loss
| style="text-align:center;"| 1–3
| Casey Noland
| Submission (rear-naked choke)
| The Cage Inc.: Battle at the Border 10
| 
| style="text-align:center;"| 1
| style="text-align:center;"| 1:18
|Hankinson, North Dakota, United States
|
|-
| Loss
| style="text-align:center;"| 1–2
| Barb Honchak
| Decision (unanimous)
| Crowbar MMA: Spring Brawl 2
| 
| style="text-align:center;"| 3
| style="text-align:center;"| 5:00
|Grand Forks, North Dakota, United States
|
|-
| Loss
| style="text-align:center;"| 1–1
| Carla Esparza
| Decision (split)
| Crowbar MMA: Winter Brawl
| 
| style="text-align:center;"| 3
| style="text-align:center;"| 5:00
|Grand Forks, North Dakota, United States
|
|-
| Win
| style="text-align:center;"| 1–0
| Catia Vitoria
| Decision (unanimous)
| Crowbar MMA: Fall Brawl
| 
| style="text-align:center;"| 5
| style="text-align:center;"| 5:00
|Fargo, North Dakota, United States
|

|-
| Win
|align=center| 3–0
| Jenny Yum
| Decision (unanimous)
| HOOKnSHOOT – GFight Summit 2010
| 
|align=center| 3
|align=center| 3:00
| Evansville, Indiana, United States
|
|-
| Win
|align=center| 2–0
| Christy Tada
| TKO (referee stoppage)
| The Future Stars of MMA
| 
|align=center| 1
|align=center| 0:46
|
|
|-
| Win
|align=center| 1–0
| Sara Seitz
| TKO (submission to punches)
| Xplosive Caged Combat
| 
|align=center| 3
|align=center| 1:30
|
|

See also 
 List of female mixed martial artists

References

External links 
 
 

1985 births
American practitioners of Brazilian jiu-jitsu
Female Brazilian jiu-jitsu practitioners
People from Weston, Florida
Mixed martial artists from Florida
Living people
Strawweight mixed martial artists
Flyweight mixed martial artists
American female mixed martial artists
Mixed martial artists utilizing taekwondo
Mixed martial artists utilizing Brazilian jiu-jitsu
American female taekwondo practitioners
American people of Macedonian descent
LGBT mixed martial artists
LGBT people from Florida
American LGBT sportspeople
Ultimate Fighting Championship female fighters
LGBT Brazilian jiu-jitsu practitioners
LGBT taekwondo practitioners
21st-century American women
Sportspeople from Broward County, Florida